Dothivalsaria is a genus of fungi in the family Massariaceae.

References

Pleosporales